is a dark fantasy manga series written by Takaya Kagami and illustrated by Yamato Yamamoto. It has been serialized by Shueisha in its Japanese monthly shōnen manga magazine, Jump SQ, since September 3, 2012. The series is set in a world where a virus has ravaged the global populace, leaving only children under the age of thirteen untouched; in its wake, vampires and other strange creatures appear from beneath the earth. A young man, Yuichiro "Yu" Hyakuya, sets out to kill the vampires after one slaughters almost all the members from his orphanage.

The 11th volume will include an original video animation. On October 7, 2013, Viz Media announced that it had added the series to its manga lineup on the company's Weekly Shonen Jump digital magazine for North American release. A voice comic (vomic) was also produced and published by Shueisha and its first episode was featured on Sakiyomi Jum-Bang! on February 1, 2013.

A spin-off gag manga to commemorate the anime adaptation titled  has been serialized by Shueisha in Jump SQ from April 2015 to January 2016, following initial publication in the 17th and 18th volumes of Jump SQ.19. It also has been published on the Seraph of the End official website.

, 15 million copies of the manga were in circulation.

Seraph of the End: Vampire Reign

}}

Chapters not yet in tankōbon format

Seraph of the End: Guren Ichinose: Catastrophe at Sixteen
A spin-off manga adaptation of Guren's light novel series was drawn by Yo Asami. It was serialized in Kodansha's Monthly Shōnen Magazine from June 6, 2017 to February 4, 2022. The first tankōbon volume was released on November 2, 2017.

References

Seraph of the End